FlexGen may refer to:
FlexGen B.V., a Dutch bankrupt biotechnology company
FlexGen Power Systems, a US energy storage technology company